Thomas Howell may refer to:

Thomas Howell (curler) (born 1994), American curler
Thomas Howell (poet), English poet
Thomas Howell (bishop) (1588–1650), Bishop of Bristol, 1644–1645
Thomas Bayly Howell (1767–1815), English lawyer and writer who edited and lent his name to Howell's State Trials
Thomas Jones Howell (1793–1858), son of Thomas Bayly Howell and co-editor of Howell's State Trials
Thomas J. Howell (politician) (1830s–?), American state legislator in Missouri, possible namegiver to Howell County
Thomas J. Howell (botanist) (1842–1912), American botanist
Thomas Raymond Howell, American ornithologist
C. Thomas Howell (born 1966), American actor and film director
Tommy Howell, rugby league footballer who played in the 1890s and 1900s
 Tom Howell (cricketer) (born 1987), English cricketer
Thomas Howell, Welsh merchant draper who bequeathed money to Howell's School, Denbigh

See also